Deputy Chief of the General Staff (DCGS) is the title of the deputy to the Chief of the General Staff, the  professional head of the British Army. From 1942 until 1968 the Deputy Chief was the third-ranking member of the General Staff, subordinate the Chief and Vice Chief. As of September 2015, the role of Deputy CGS is to be "responsible for representing the Army Top Level Budget (TLB) within Head Office and outwards to relevant TLBs and dependencies, provides oversight of the Army Operating Model and provides overall personnel policy direction as the Principal Personnel Officer (PPO)."

Subordinate Commands
The commands under DCGS include:
 Director Reserves
 Director Support
 Director Personnel
 Director Resources - civilian post
 Assistant Chief of the General Staff
 Chaplain-General
 Director Basing and Infrastructure
 Director Army Legal Services
 Director Capability
 Director Information
 Director Engagement and Communications

List of post-holders
Post-holders have been as follows:

Deputy Chief of the Imperial General Staff
 Major-General Sir Henry Lawson November 1914 – January 1915
 Lieutenant-General Sir Archibald Murray February 1915 – September 1915
 Major-General Sir Launcelot Kiggell November 1915 – December 1915
 Major-General Robert Whigham December 1915 – April 1918
 Major-General Sir Charles Harington 1918–1920
 Lieutenant-General Sir Philip Chetwode, 1920–1922
 Lieutenant-General Sir Ronald Adam 1938–1939
 Major-General Hugh Massy 1939–1940
 Lieutenant-General Sir Ronald Weeks 15 June 1942 – 29 May 1945
 Lieutenant-General Sir Sidney Kirkman 1945–1947
 Lieutenant-General Sir Kenneth Crawford 1947–1949
 Lieutenant-General Sir John Whiteley 1949–1953
 Lieutenant-General Sir Dudley Ward 1953–1956
 Lieutenant-General Sir Richard Hull 1956–1958
 Lieutenant-General Sir Harold Pyman 1958–1961
 Lieutenant-General Sir John Anderson 1961–1963
 Lieutenant-General Sir John Hackett 1963–1966
 General Sir Charles Harington 1966–1968
 Lieutenant-General Sir Ian Freeland April 1968 – December 1968

Deputy Chief of the General Staff
 Lieutenant-General Mark Poffley Spring 2015 – December 2015
 Lieutenant-General Nick Pope 2015–2019
 Lieutenant-General Christopher Tickell 2019–2022
 Lieutenant-General Sharon Nesmith August 2022–Present

References

Senior appointments of the British Army